Svengali is a 2013 British film directed by John Hardwick, written by Jonny Owen, and starring Martin Freeman, Vicky McClure, Matt Berry, Michael Socha, Michael Smiley, Vauxhall Jermaine and Natasha O'Keeffe. The film was produced by Root Films.

Synopsis 

Dixie (Jonny Owen) is a postman from South Wales, a mod, and a music fanatic. All his life he's dreamed of discovering a great band and then one day, trawling through YouTube, he finds them... 'The Premature Congratulations' (aka The Prims). He hunts them down and offers them his management services. They are young, arrogant, sexy and utterly magnificent. Putting their demo on a cassette tape, Dixie heads out onto the streets of London... Innocent, wide-eyed Dixie embarks on a roller coaster ride through the most infamous industry of them all. His partner and his sanity through it all is his soulmate Michelle (Vicky McClure).

Dixe hunts down an old friend Horsey (Roger Evans), who is in the music business, however Horsey wants nothing do with his old friend. While pestering Horsey in a pub, he meets Alan McGee, famous band manager. Dixie borrows money to set up the band for their first gig, and running low on cash, takes money that was meant for him and Shell's wedding. The gig goes very well, with a huge turnout and lots of industry people turn up, even with the BBC offering a gig.
However, Dixie is burning through cash. Dixie gets a job at Don's records. Don (Martin Freeman) is also a mod, and his wife insists on giving him a job.

Dixie continues trying to get gigs for the band, who are constantly borrowing money from him. He tries to work at Don's, but ends up getting sacked because he makes mistakes. Horsey's boss at the management agency Jeremy Braines (Matt Berry), hears how big the Prims are getting and tells Horsey he must sign them.
The Prims get kicked out of their flat, and start living at Dixies and Shell's flat, and in the meantime, Dixie goes back to his family in Wales for a quick visit, only to find out his dad is dying. Upon return to London, he goes back to his flat; Shell is at the end of her tether with all the money problems, the final straw being when she finds the money for their wedding has been spent.

Locked out of the flat, by the Russian landlady Vanya because they haven't paid the rent, he breaks in to grab his prized possession, his soul records, and then finds himself homeless in London. Horsey offers him a place to stay for the night and buys his prized records for 5000 pounds. Dixie uses that to pay off his loans. Finally, with the band starting to be successful, but his own life in a romantic and financial mess, he realises he needs to make a choice between the band, and his love for Michelle.

Cast 

 Jonny Owen as Dixie
 Vicky McClure as Shell
 Roger Evans as Horsey
 Martin Freeman as Don
 Maxine Peake as Angie
 Matt Berry as Jeremy Braines
 Michael Socha as Tommy
 Michael Smiley as Irish Pierre
 Natasha O'Keeffe as Natasha
 Morwenna Banks as Francine 
 Ciarán Griffiths as Burnsy
 Joel Fry as Macca
 Dylan Edwards as Jake
 Curtis Lee Thompson as Scott
 Jessica Ellerby as Alice
 Vauxhall Jermaine as Marcus
 Katy Brand as Katya
 Di Botcher as Mrs. Cooper
 Brian Hibbard as Dixie's Dad
 Huw Stephens as Himself
 Alan McGee as Himself
 Max Rushden as Himself
 Carl Barat as Himself
Pearl Mackie as F.O.H Girl

Edinburgh Film Festival 

Svengali was selected to show at the 67th Edinburgh International Film Festival. It has also been nominated for the Michael Powell Award; a prize which honours the best British feature film.

References

External links 

 
 
 
 Svengali at Edinburgh
 Svengali at Edinburgh International Film Festival
 Vicky McClure interview talking about Svengali in the Big Issue

2013 films
2013 comedy films
British comedy films
Universal Pictures films
2010s English-language films
2010s British films